The 1955 Furman Purple Hurricane football team was an American football team that represented Furman University as a member of the Southern Conference (SoCon) during the 1955 college football season. Led by first-year head coach Homer Hobbs, the Purple Hurricane compiled an overall record of 1–9 with a mark of 1–1 in conference play, tying for sixth place in the SoCon.

Schedule

References

Furman
Furman Paladins football seasons
Furman Purple Hurricane football